Rokitamycin is a macrolide antibiotic synthesized from strains of Streptomyces kitasatoensis.

References

External links
 Recent Publications on Rokitamycin

Macrolide antibiotics